Anton Alekseyevich Shitov (born 29 January 2000) is a Russian football player. He plays for FC Spartak Moscow.

Career

Club
Shitov made his debut in the Russian Professional Football League for FC Ararat Moscow on 28 July 2017 in a game against FC Kaluga. He made his Russian Football National League debut for FC Spartak-2 Moscow on 13 April 2019 in a game against FC SKA-Khabarovsk.

International
Shitov represented Russia national under-17 football team in the 2017 UEFA European Under-17 Championship qualification.

Career statistics

Club

References

External links
 Profile by Russian Professional Football League

2000 births
Footballers from Moscow
Living people
Russian footballers
Russia youth international footballers
Association football goalkeepers
FC Spartak Moscow players
FC Spartak-2 Moscow players
FC Ararat Moscow players
FC Lokomotiv Moscow players
Russian First League players
Russian Second League players